The Belgian Athletics Championships is an annual outdoor track and field competition organised by the Royal Belgian Athletics League, which serves as the national championship for the sport in Belgium.

Typically organised in July in Brussels, the event was first held in 1889 and introduced the first events for women in 1921. The competition was not held in the years from 1915 to 1918 due to World War I and also did not take place in 1940 and 1944 due to World War II.

Separate annual championship events are held for the 10,000 metres, relay races, combined track and field events, cross country running and the road running and racewalking events. There is also a Belgian Indoor Athletics Championships and an outdoor Belgian club championships.

Events
The competition programme features a total of 34 individual Belgian Championship athletics events, 17 for men and 17 for women. There are six track running events, three obstacle events, four jumps, and four throws.

Track running
100 metres, 200 metres, 400 metres, 800 metres, 1500 metres, 5000 metres
Obstacle events
100 metres hurdles (women only), 110 metres hurdles (men only), 400 metres hurdles, 3000 metres steeplechase
Jumping events
Pole vault, high jump, long jump, triple jump
Throwing events
Shot put, discus throw, javelin throw, hammer throw

Men competed in a 200 metres hurdles until 1964, by which point the event had fallen out of favour in international competitions. The women's programme was gradually expanded from the 1960s onwards, with the 1500 m appearing in 1969, the 3000 m in 1973, triple jump in 1991, hammer throw and pole vault in 1995, and steeplechase in 2001. The women's hurdles events gradually changed too: the 80 metres hurdles became the 100 m version in 1969, a 200 m version was held from 1969 to 1975, then the women's 400 m hurdles began in 1976. The women's combined event was the athletics pentathlon up to 1980 and the 3000 metres was extended to match the men's 5000 m distance in 1995.

Editions

References

 
Athletics competitions in Belgium
National athletics competitions
Recurring sporting events established in 1889
Athletics